Nashestvie was the largest open-air festival of Russian rock, organized by Nashe Radio station. It was held annually during the first weekend of July (first weekend of August until 2006) in the environs of Moscow, Russia, since 1999 and has been open air since 2000. Nashestvie has changed its venue several times: it was initially held in Ramenskoye, Moscow Oblast, but recently it moved northwest to Tver Oblast. It was held each year since then until 2019 (except in 2007, when an unofficial replacement festval was held instead). Since 2020 Nashestvie is being regularly banned by the Russian authorities. 

The festival's name is a word play in Russian: it literally means "invasion", but is also derived from the name of Nashe Radio (Our Radio). Media also dubbed it "Russian Woodstock".

Format
Nashestvie is participated in by the majority of Russia's most popular rock artists (such as Aria, Alisa, Agatha Christie, Splean, Korol i Shut), as well as bands from Ukraine and Belarus, such as Okean Elzy or Lyapis Trubetskoy. Most of the headliners represent the usual Nashe Radio playlist.

Bands are not paid for participating in Nashestvie (unlike those participating in the rival Krylya Festival). Instead, the festival is used as a free promotion for them. Young and obscure bands can participate in Nashestvie; they play in the mornings or, since 2005, on special separate stages. Some bands, namely Epidemia and Melnitsa, which begun their Nashestvie history in "genre ghettos", recently started to play on the main stage.

History

See also

List of historic rock festivals

References

External links

Official website
Unofficial Fan website

Music festivals established in 1999
Rock festivals in Russia
Culture of Tver Oblast